Popăuţi Monastery is a monastery located in Botoșani, Romania, on Ştefan cel Mare Street no. 41, near the train station. It was founded in 1496 by the voivode Stephen the Great (1457-1504).

It is listed as a historic monument by Romania's Ministry of Culture and National Identity.

References
 
 

Romanian Orthodox monasteries of Botoșani County
Botoșani
Historic monuments in Botoșani County
Churches completed in 1496